Over the Rainbow – The Songbird Collection is a compilation album of female singer/songwriters, recorded by various artists and released in 2005 (see 2005 in music). Contained in this collection are the greats of years past and the forerunners of contemporary music, ranging from Eva Cassidy and Katie Melua to Joan Baez and Natalie Cole.

Track listing

Disc One
 "Over the Rainbow" – Eva Cassidy
 "Faraway Voice" – Katie Melua
 "Cry Me a River" – Diana Krall
 "You're Still the One" – Shania Twain
 "What You're Made Of" – Lucie Silvas
 "Say What You Want" – Texas
 "Stay" – Beulah
 "The Weakness in Me" – Joan Armatrading
 "I Heard Love Is Blind" – Amy Winehouse
 "Two Grey Rooms" – Joni Mitchell
 "I Don't Want to Talk About It" – Everything but the Girl
 "Mary, Did You Know?" – Hayley Westenra
 "Forever Young" – Joan Baez
 "Give Me a Little More Time" – Gabrielle
 "Coming Around Again" – Carly Simon
 "Grow Old with Me" – Mary Chapin Carpenter
 "Do What You Have to Do" – Sarah McLachlan
 "Down by the Sally Gardens" – Roisin O'Reilly
 "Lead the Way" – Lizz Wright

Disc Two
 "Runaway" – The Corrs
 "Marlene on the Wall" – Suzanne Vega
 "The Man I Love" – Alison Moyet
 "The Windmills of Your Mind" – Dusty Springfield
 "What You Do With What You Got" – Eddi Reader with The Patron Saints Of Imperfection
 "Down to the River to Pray" – Alison Krauss
 "A Thousand Miles" – Vanessa Carlton
 "Every Little Thing She Does Is Magic" – Shawn Colvin
 "Only Love Can Break Your Heart" – Gwyneth Herbert
 "Completely" – Jodie Brooke Wilson
 "Dreamsome" – Shelby Lynne
 "Dance Me to the End of Love" – Madeleine Peyroux
 "The Moon and St Christopher" – Mary Black
 "Sleeping Satellite" – Tasmin Archer
 "Don't Know Why" – Jude Sim
 "Both Sides Now" – Nana
 "Falling" – Moya Brennan
 "Tell Me All About It" – Natalie Cole
 "Strange Winds Blow" – Honeyriders
 "Breathe Me" – Sia

References

2005 compilation albums